Ján Žiška (born 29 January 1971) is a Slovak rower. He competed at the 1996 Summer Olympics and the 2000 Summer Olympics.

References

External links
 

1971 births
Living people
Slovak male rowers
Olympic rowers of Slovakia
Rowers at the 1996 Summer Olympics
Rowers at the 2000 Summer Olympics
Sportspeople from Bratislava